Robert Earl (born 29 May 1951) is an English-American businessman who is the founder and CEO of Planet Hollywood, Chairman of the Planet Hollywood Resort & Casino in Las Vegas, and host of  Robert Earl's Be My Guest television program which airs weekly on the Cooking Channel.

Early life
Robert Earl was born Robert Ian Leigh, son of British entertainer Robert Earl. Earl grew up in Hendon and was educated at the local school, but also travelled around a great deal in the UK, Europe and the United States, following his father's career.

Earl graduated from the University of Surrey with an honours degree in Hotel and Catering Management. In 2012, he set up the Robert Earl Scholarship, awarded each year to 14 students across the School of Hospitality and Tourism Management, worth up to £2,500 each.

Business career and investments
Earl was named one of "The 25 Most Influential Americans" by Time in 2001.

President Entertainment 
Earl began his career with his first Beefeater medieval theatre-themed restaurant in 1972. With its success, Earl opened additional themed restaurants, The Cockney Club, Shakespeare's Tavern, and Talk of London, close by in the late 1970s. Seeing the US market as having more growth potential, he attempted to sell the concepts to developers working on the Disney's EPCOT, but the deal fell through. He stayed to open several theme-restaurants with medieval and Wild West concepts in the Orlando market. Amongst those themed restaurants in central Florida were Caruso's Palace (now Race Rock), King Henry's Feast and the original Shakespeare's Tavern on Church Street.

Earl quickly grew the business into a restaurant empire totalling 70 restaurants by the time he merged his company President Entertainment with Pleasurama PLC, a London-based leisure group, in 1987. The transaction yielded Earl $63 million.

Pleasurama PLC and Hard Rock Cafe 
Joining the board, he was tasked to undertake the purchase of Hard Rock Cafe. After quickly becoming the brand's CEO, Earl grew Hard Rock from 7 to 22 units in just 5 years, resulting in the eventual sale of the brand to Rank Group. Earl was also a director of Pelican Group PLC, which owns the Café Rouge, Dôme, and Mamma Amalfi brands. leaving the company after its sale to Whitbread PLC.

Planet Hollywood

Planet Hollywood Restaurants 
In 1991, Earl founded Planet Hollywood, negotiating celebrity investments from Arnold Schwarzenegger and Bruce Willis, and partnerships including Demi Moore, and Sylvester Stallone. Earl has since bought it back from Chapter 11 bankruptcy twice, but he still owns a large amount of stock with original investors Schwarzenegger and Willis, alongside new Asian investors.

Planet Hollywood Hotels 
In June 2003, in partnership with Bay Harbour Management LC and Starwood, Earl purchased the Aladdin Resort and Casino on the Las Vegas Strip. In 2007 it was relaunched as the Planet Hollywood Resort & Casino. In 2010, Earl sold the property to Caesars Entertainment, but retained the brands license.

Earl of Sandwich
In 2004, Robert Earl, Lord John Montagu, and Orlando Montagu founded Earl of Sandwich, a series of sandwich shops, and opened the first location at Downtown Disney. Earl of Sandwich has since become a franchise with 36 locations, and Earl serves as the Chairman.

Everton Football Club
In October 2006, Earl became a 23% owner and director of English Premier League club Everton, buying the shareholding of Paul and Anita Gregg via his BCR Sports investment vehicle registered in the British Virgin Islands.

In March 2016, Earl sold his stake in Everton Football Club to Farhad Moshiri at a reported £175million valuation.

Buca di Beppo Italian Restaurants 
In 2008, he acquired the casual dining company Buca di Beppo and its chain of 88 restaurants, which serve family-style Italian fare.  Earl, Chairman of Buca, has expanded the chain of Italian restaurants into new locations in both the US and internationally. Buca di Beppo features dishes from villages in Northern and Southern Italy and is equally famous for its quirky décor and upbeat atmosphere.

Bertucci's Brick Oven Pizzeria Restaurants 
In 2018, he acquired the Bertucci's Company and its 59 locations, predominantly located in New England and the northeastern United States.

Chicken Guy!
In 2018, Earl and Guy Fieri partnered to open a fried chicken fast-food chain called Chicken Guy! The first location opened at Disney Springs in Orlando, Florida. Additional locations have opened at FedEx Field, Levi's Stadium, and the Aventura Mall in Aventura, Florida.

Bravo! Italian Kitchen and Brio Italian Grille
In June 2020, Earl through Earl Enterprises acquired Bravo! Italian Kitchen and Brio Italian Grille restaurant chains for $30 million after they went bankrupt in April. The acquisition included 45 of their locations across 19 U.S. states and the rehiring of over 4,000 previous employees.

Virtual Dining Concepts
In 2018, Earl launched Virtual Dining Concepts, a company centered around starting virtual kitchen businesses that are delivery only. Some concepts created include Wing Squad as well as various celebrity collaborations like Tyga Bites and MrBeast Burger.

Entertainment Media

Television Series

Host of Robert Earl's Be My Guest television program
As Host of Robert Earl's Be My Guest, Earl travels the world exploring popular restaurants and dishes out his knowledge from decades in the dining industry. The series premiered in September 2014 and airs weekly on the Cooking Channel.  The show's success was celebrated with a primetime marathon in February 2015.

Recurring Investor on the Food Fortunes television program
On the Food Fortunes television program, food visionaries pitch their products to a rotating panel of Investors, who are some of the biggest names in the food, online and retail industry. Earl is a recurring castmember during Season 1, as a member of the Panel of Investors.  The series, which premiered on 9 March 2015, airs weekly on the Food Network.

Guest Judge during Season 1 of On The Menu television program
In 2014, Robert Earl was a guest judge on two episodes of the television series On the Menu, which was produced by Mark Burnett and aired on TNT television network. Each episode features contestants battle to create a dish to put on the menu of a national restaurant chain.  Two Episodes of On the Menu centred around restaurant chains owned by Robert Earl, for which he served on the panel of judges deciding the winner.  In Season 1 Episode 4, the final challenge was creating a dessert for Earl's Planet Hollywood restaurants. In Season 1 Episode 9, the final challenge was creating a pasta dish for Earl's Buca di Beppo restaurants.

Television Appearances
 Guest on NBC's Late Night with Seth Meyers on 16 December 2014.
 Interviewed on Fox Business Network's Varney & Co. on 3 November 2014
 Interviewed on Fox Business Network's Varney & Co. on 10 September 2014
 Interviewed on Fox Business Network's Varney & Co. on 20 August 2014
 Final Judge for the 2012 Miss USA Pageant, which was broadcast on NBC on 3 June 2012 and was filmed at his Planet Hollywood Resort & Casino in Las Vegas.
 Appeared on Diners, Drive-Ins and Dives with Guy Fieri and Joey Fatone.  Visited Mrs. Potato restaurant in Orlando, Florida.

Film Production
 Executive Producer of Wild Card (2015) starring Jason Statham, Michael Angarano, Dominik Garcia-Lorido, Milo Ventimiglia, Hope Davis, and Stanley Tucci.
 Executive Producer of The Expendables 3 (2014) starring Sylvester Stallone, Jason Statham, Jet Li, Dolph Lundgren, Randy Couture, Terry Crews, and Arnold Schwarzenegger.
 Co-Producer of The Expendables 2 (2012) starring Sylvester Stallone, Jason Statham, Jet Li, Dolph Lundgren, Chuck Norris, Terry Crews, Randy Couture, Liam Hemsworth, Jean-Claude Van Damme, Bruce Willis, and Arnold Schwarzenegger.
 Co-Producer of The Expendables (2010) starring Sylvester Stallone, Jason Statham, Jet Li, Dolph Lundgren, Randy Couture, Terry Crews, Steve Austin and Mickey Rourke.

Personal life
Earl and his wife Tricia have three children and reside in Orlando, Florida.

References

External links

Profile at Business Week
Profile at  Boston University
Profile at Everton Football Club

1951 births
Living people
People from Hendon
English Jews
Alumni of the University of Surrey
English restaurateurs
Restaurant founders
Everton F.C. directors and chairmen
English expatriates in the United States
English football chairmen and investors
English television personalities
English television presenters
Businesspeople in the casino industry
English investors
Television judges
Businesspeople from London
British film producers